The Grinold and Kroner Model is used to calculate expected returns for a stock, stock index or the market as whole.

Description

The model states that:

Where
 are the expected returns 
  is the dividend in next period (period 1 assuming current t=0)
  is the current price (price at time 0)
  is the expected inflation rate
  is the real growth rate in earnings (note that by adding real growth and inflation, this is basically identical to just adding nominal growth)
  is the changes in shares outstanding (i.e. increases in shares outstanding decrease expected returns)
  is the changes in P/E ratio (positive relationship between changes in P/e and expected returns)

One offshoot of this discounted cash flow analysis is the disputed Fed model, which compares the earnings yield to the nominal 10-year Treasury bond yield.

Grinold, Kroner, and Siegel (2011) estimated the inputs to the Grinold and Kroner model and arrived at a then-current equity risk premium estimate between 3.5% and 4%.  The equity risk premium is the difference between the expected total return on a capitalization-weighted stock market index and the yield on a riskless government bond (in this case one with 10 years to maturity).

References

Economics models